The Hell Creek Formation is an intensively studied division of mostly Upper Cretaceous and some lower Paleocene rocks in North America, named for exposures studied along Hell Creek, near Jordan, Montana. The formation stretches over portions of Montana, North Dakota, South Dakota, and Wyoming. In Montana, the Hell Creek Formation overlies the Fox Hills Formation. The site of Pompeys Pillar National Monument is a small isolated section of the Hell Creek Formation. In 1966, the Hell Creek Fossil Area was designated as a National Natural Landmark by the National Park Service.

It is a series of fresh and brackish-water clays, mudstones, and sandstones deposited during the Maastrichtian and Danian (respectively, the end of the Cretaceous period and the beginning of the Paleogene) by fluvial activity in fluctuating river channels and deltas and very occasional peaty swamp deposits along the low-lying eastern continental margin fronting the late Cretaceous Western Interior Seaway. The climate was mild, and the presence of crocodilians suggests a subtropical climate, with no prolonged annual cold. The famous iridium-enriched Cretaceous–Paleogene boundary, which separates the Cretaceous from the Cenozoic, occurs as a discontinuous but distinct thin marker bedding above and occasionally within the formation, near its boundary with the overlying Fort Union Formation.

The world's largest collection of Hell Creek fossils is housed and exhibited at the Museum of the Rockies, in Bozeman, Montana. The specimens displayed are the result of the museum's Hell Creek Project, a joint effort between the museum, Montana State University, the University of Washington, the University of California, Berkeley, the University of North Dakota, and the University of North Carolina which began in 1998.

Description 
The Hell Creek Formation is an intensively studied geological formation of mostly Upper Cretaceous and some Early Paleocene rocks in North America, named for exposures studied along Hell Creek, near Jordan, Montana. The formation stretches over portions of Montana, North Dakota, South Dakota, and Wyoming. In Montana, the Hell Creek Formation overlies the Fox Hills Formation.

In 1966, the Hell Creek Fossil Area was designated as a National Natural Landmark by the National Park Service.

Geology 

The Hell Creek Formation in Montana overlies the Fox Hills Formation and underlies the Fort Union Formation, and the boundary with the latter occurs near the Cretaceous-Paleogene boundary (K-Pg), which defines the end of the Cretaceous period and has been dated to 66 ± 0.07 Ma old. The  thickness of the formation is estimated to have been deposited in about 2 million years. Fauna characteristic of the Hell Creek (Lancian land vertebrate age ) are found as high as a few meters below the boundary.

On the other hand, in some small regions of Montana, the Hell Creek Formation contains the K-Pg boundary, and extends slightly into the Paleogene.

The Tanis site in North Dakota contains evidence of what is proposed to be a record of the effects of the Chicxulub meteorite impact – such as the chaotic mixing of fossil carcasses and a layer of glass tektites with associated impact impressions – deposited minutes to hours after the impact.

Paleobiology 

The remains of many animals including dinosaurs were found in the Hell Creek Formation. Its location at the changing conjunction of the eastern coast of Laramidia and the adjacent western shallows of the Western Interior Seaway led to the preservation of fossils of both marine and terrestrial creatures. Vertebrates include dinosaurs, pterosaurs, crocodiles, champsosaurs, lizards, snakes, turtles, frogs and salamanders. Remains of fishes and mammals have also been found in the Hell Creek Formation. The formation has produced impressive assemblages of invertebrates (including ammonites), plants, mammals, fish, reptiles (including the lizard Obamadon), marine reptiles (including the marine reptiles like mosasaurs, plesiosaurs and sea turtles), and amphibians. Notable dinosaur finds include Tyrannosaurus and Triceratops, ornithomimids as well, caenagnathids like Anzu, a variety of small theropods, pachycephalosaurs, ankylosaurs, crocodylomorphs and squamates, including various animal fossils unearthed in the Hell Creek Formation. The most complete hadrosaurid dinosaur ever found, an Edmontosaurus, was retrieved in 2000 from the Hell Creek Formation and widely publicized in a National Geographic documentary aired in December 2007. A few bird, mammal, and pterosaur fossils have also been found. The teeth of sharks and rays are sometimes found in the riverine Hell Creek Formation, suggesting that some of these taxa were then, as now, tolerant of fresh water. The "Lancian" fauna is more similar overall phylogenetically to East Asian and Canadian/Alaskan faunas than most Campanian North American faunas. Fossil insects from inclusions found within amber are known.

Depositional environment 

It is a series of fresh and brackish-water clays, mudstones, and sandstones deposited during the Maastrichtian and Danian (respectively, the end of the Cretaceous period and the beginning of the Paleogene) by fluvial activity in fluctuating channels and deltas and very occasional peaty swamp deposits along the low-lying eastern continental margin fronting the late Cretaceous Western Interior Seaway. The Hell Creek Formation, as typified by exposures in the Fort Peck area of Montana, has been interpreted as a flat, forested floodplain with a relatively subtropical climate that supported a variety of plants ranging from angiosperm trees to conifers such as the bald cypress, ferns and ginkgos. The Hell Creek Formation was laid down by streams, on a coastal plain along the edge of the Western Interior Seaway. The presence of crocodylians suggests climate was subtropical; there was no cold season and probably ample precipitation.

The Hell Creek Formation, Lance Formation and Scollard Formation represent different sections of the western shore of the shallow sea that divided western and eastern North America during the Cretaceous. Swampy lowlands were the habitat of various animals, including dinosaurs. A broad coastal plain extended westward from the seaway to the newly formed Rocky Mountains. These formations are composed largely of sandstone and mudstone which have been attributed to floodplain, fluvial, lacustrine, swamp, estuarine and coastal plain environments. Hell Creek is the best studied of these ancient environments. At the time, this region had a subtropical, warm and moist climate. The climate was humid, with flowering plants, conifers, palmettos, and ferns in the swamps, and conifers, canopy, understory plants, ash trees, live oak and shrubs in the forests. In northwestern South Dakota, strips of black layers deposited in the wetland environment are rich in coal, and a bright band-like layer of sand and mud from the river floodplain accumulated. Many plant species were supported, primarily angiosperms, and less commonly conifers, bald cypress, ferns and cycads. An abundance of fossil leaves are found at dozens of different sites indicating that the area was largely forested by small trees.

Fossil content

Dinosaurs 

A paleo-population study is one of the most difficult of analyses to conduct in field paleontology. Here is the most recent estimate of the proportions of the eight most common dinosaurian families in the Hell Creek Formation, based on detailed field studies by Horner, Goodwin, and Myhrvold (2011).

 Ceratopsidae 40%
 Tyrannosauridae 24%
 Hadrosauridae 20%
 Hypsilophodontidae 8%
 Ornithomimidae 5%
 Ankylosauridae 1%
 Pachycephalosauridae 1%
 Troodontidae 1% (represented only by teeth)
 Dromaeosauridae 1% (represented only by teeth)

Outcrops sampled by the Hell Creek Project were divided into three sections: lower, middle and upper slices. The top and bottom sections were the focus of the PLoS One report, and within each portion many remains of Triceratops, Edmontosaurus, and Tyrannosaurus were found. Triceratops was the most common in each section, but, surprisingly, Tyrannosaurus was just as common, if not slightly more common, than the hadrosaur Edmontosaurus. In the upper Hell Creek section, for example, the census included twenty two Triceratops, five Tyrannosaurus, and five Edmontosaurus.

The dinosaurs Thescelosaurus, Ornithomimus, Pachycephalosaurus and Ankylosaurus were also included in the breakdown, but were relatively rare. Other dinosaurs, such as Sphaerotholus, Denversaurus, Torosaurus, Struthiomimus, Acheroraptor, Dakotaraptor, Pectinodon, a possible Parasaurolophus walkeri, Richardoestesia, Paronychodon, Anzu, Leptorhynchos and Troodon (more likely Pectinodon), were reported as being rare and are not included in the breakdown.

The dinosaur collections made over the past decade during the Hell Creek Project yielded new information from an improved genus-level collecting schema and robust data set that revealed relative dinosaur abundances that were unexpected, and ontogenetic age classes previously considered rare. We recognize a much higher percentage of Tyrannosaurus than previous surveys. Tyrannosaurus equals Edmontosaurus in U3 and in L3 comprises a greater percentage of the large dinosaur fauna as the second-most abundant taxon after Triceratops, followed by Edmontosaurus. This is surprisingly consistent in (1) the two major lag deposits (MOR loc. HC-530 and HC-312) in the Apex sandstone and Jen-rex sand where individual bones were counted and (2) in two thirds of the formation reflected in L3 and U3 records of dinosaur skeletons only.

Triceratops is by far the most common dinosaur at 40% (n = 72), Tyrannosaurus is second at 24% (n = 44), Edmontosaurus is third at 20% (n = 36), followed by Thescelosaurus at 8% (n = 15), Ornithomimus at 5% (n = 9), and Pachycephalosaurus and Ankylosaurus both at 1% (n = 2) are relatively rare.

Fossil footprints of dinosaurs from the Hell Creek Formation are very rare. As of 2017, there is only one find of a possible Tyrannosaurus rex footprint, dating from 2007 and described a year later. The largest Triceratops skull ever discovered, nicknamed 'Dragon King', was found in Glendive, Montana, which is in the Hell Creek Formation.

Eumaniraptorans 
Historically, numerous teeth have been attributed to various Dromaeosaurid and Troodontid taxa with known body fossils from only older formations, including Dromaeosaurus, Saurornitholestes, and Troodon. However, in a 2013 study, Evans et al. concluded that there is little evidence for more than a single dromaeosaurid taxon, Acheroraptor, in the Hell Creek-Lance assemblages, which would render these taxa invalid for this formation. This was disproved in a 2015 study, DePalma et al., when they described the new genus Dakotaraptor, a large species of dromaeosaur. Fossilized teeth of various troodontids and coelurosaurs are common throughout the Hell Creek Formation; the best known examples include Paronychodon, Pectinodon and Richardoestesia, respectively.

Flora 

The Hell Creek Formation was a low floodplain at the time before the sea retreated, and in the wet ground of the dense woodland, laurels, sycamores, beech, magnolias, and palm trees grew. Ferns and moss grew in the forest understory. Plant fossils from the upper early Paleocene of the Hell Creek Formation include the ferns Botrychium, Woodwardia, Osmunda, Onoclea and Azolla; conifers Metasequoia, Glyptostrobus and Cupressaceous conifers; the monocot Limnobiophyllum (a relative of duckweeds); and the dicots Cercidiphyllum and Platanus. There are numerous types of leaves, seeds, flowers and other structures from Angiosperms, or flowering plants. The Hell Creek Formation of this layer contains 300 tablets or more of plants. Angiosperms are by far the most diverse and dominant flora of the entire population, about 90 percent. However, the evergreens included conifers, ginkgo, bald cypress, and cycads. Flowering plants included a variety of trees that no longer exist. Today Hell Creek's flora is hardwood forest mixed with deciduous and evergreen forest and apparently similar to then, but with a closer look, the current plant community is distinct. In sharp contrast to Montana today, the presence of palm trees meant the climate was warmer then.

Kirk Johnson claims that there are no grasses, oaks, maples, or willows in the Hell Creek Formation. Ferns are uncommon in the majority of the formation, however there is a great increase in the abundance of fossil fern spores in the two centimeters of rock that directly overlies the impact fallout layer (the famous K-T boundary layer). This increase in fern spore abundance is commonly referred to as "the fern spike" (meaning that if the abundance of spores as a function of stratigraphic position were plotted out, the graph would show a spike just above the impact fallout layer). Johnson also found that the majority of the angiosperm genera in the Hell Creek Formation are now extinct. He also believes that, very roughly, 80% of the terrestrial plant taxa died out in what is now Montana and the Dakotas at the K/T boundary.

Many of the modern plant affinities in the Hell Creek Formation (e.g., those with the prefix "aff." or with quotes around the genus name) may not in reality belong to these genera; instead they could be entirely different plants that resemble modern genera. Therefore, there is some question regarding whether the modern Populus or Juglans, as two examples, actually lived in the late Cretaceous.

Compared to the rich Hell Creek Formation fossil plant localities of the Dakotas, relatively few plant specimens have been collected from Montana. A few taxa were collected at Brownie Butte Montana by Shoemaker, but most plants were collected from North Dakota (Slope County) and from South Dakota. "TYPE" after the binomial means that it is represented by a type specimen found in the Yale-Peabody Museum collections. "YPM" is the prefix for the Yale-Peabody Museum specimen number.

Overview (from Johnson, 1997):
190 plant morphotypes, including:
 1 bryophyte (mosses and liverworts)
 6 "pteridophytes" (A paraphyletic group: modern examples are horsetails, club mosses and ferns.)
 9 conifers
 2 ginkgo (uncommon)
 172 angiosperms (90% of all specimens collected, as well as 90% of all taxa found)

Plants of the Hell Creek Formation
 various ferns and cycads
 Equisetum (Equisetaceae)

Gymnosperms

 Platyspiroxylon (Cupressaceae)
 Podocarpoxylon (Podocarpaceae)
 Elatocladus (Taxodiaceae)
 Sequoiaxylon (Taxodiaceae)
 Taxodioxylon (Taxodiaceae)
 Araucaria (Araucariaceae)
 Cheirolepidiaceae

Ginkgos
 Baiera
 Ginkgo adiantoides

Angiosperms

 Artocarpus (Moraceae)
 Barberry family (Berberidaceae)
 Cercidiphyllum (Cercidiphyllaceae)
 Dombeyopsis (Sterculiaceae)
 Laurel family (Lauraceae)
 Magnolia (Magnoliaceae)
 Palms (Arecaceae)
 Platanus, sycamore or plane tree (Platanaceae)

See also 
 List of fossil sites (with link directory)
 Lists of dinosaur-bearing stratigraphic units
 Morrison Formation
 Cretaceous-Paleogene formations
 Denver Formation
 Ferris Formation
 Lefipán Formation, Argentina
 Lopez de Bertodano Formation, Antarctica
 Tremp Formation, Spain

References

Bibliography 

General
  
 
 
 

Geology

      
    
   
 
 

Paleontology

Further reading

External links 
 Cretaceous Hell Creek Faunal Facies  provides a faunal list
 Phillip Bigelow, "Hell Creek life: Fossil Flora & Fauna, a Paleoecosystem"
 Paleobiology Database: MPM locality 3850 (Hell Creek Formation): Maastrichtian, Montana

 
Geologic formations of the United States
Cretaceous Montana
Cretaceous geology of North Dakota
Cretaceous geology of South Dakota
Cretaceous geology of Wyoming
Paleogene Montana
Paleogene geology of North Dakota
Paleogene geology of South Dakota
Paleogene geology of Wyoming
Natural history of Montana
Natural history of North Dakota
Natural history of South Dakota
Natural history of Wyoming
Fossiliferous stratigraphic units of North America
Paleontology in the United States
National Natural Landmarks in Montana
Upper Cretaceous Series of North America